Romain Pitau (born 8 August 1977) is a French professional football manager and former player who played as a midfielder. He was most recently the manager of Ligue 1 club Montpellier.

Managerial statistics

Honours
Lens
 Ligue 1: 1997–98

Montpellier
 Ligue 1: 2011–12

Sochaux
 Coupe de France: 2007

References

External links

1977 births
Living people
People from Douai
Sportspeople from Nord (French department)
French footballers
Footballers from Hauts-de-France
Association football midfielders
Ligue 1 players
Ligue 2 players
RC Lens players
US Créteil-Lusitanos players
OGC Nice players
FC Sochaux-Montbéliard players
Montpellier HSC players
Ligue 1 managers
Montpellier HSC managers